Kullamani (1952–2013) was an Indian actor and comedian who appeared in South Indian films. He acted over 500 films. He is known for films like Karagattakaran, Apoorva Sagodharargal, Panakkaran, My Dear Marthandan, and many more.

Partial filmography

Death
He died after a month-long hospitalization in the city on 25 December 2013. He was 61. He had been admitted to the Kilpauk Government Hospital because of kidney failure.

References

External links
 

Tamil comedians
Male actors from Tamil Nadu
Male actors in Tamil cinema
1952 births
2013 deaths
Date of birth missing
Place of birth missing
People from Pudukkottai district
20th-century Indian male actors
21st-century Indian male actors
Indian male comedians